Wanderlust (stylized as WANDERlust) is the debut solo album by Bush frontman Gavin Rossdale. It is his first studio album since Institute's Distort Yourself in 2005. Rossdale's initial working title for the record was This Place is on Fire, now the moniker for the release's a cappella coda piece. The lead single, "Love Remains the Same," was released digitally on April 1, 2008.

The album was produced by Bob Rock and finds Rossdale collaborating with drummer Josh Freese, former Helmet member and Bush tour guitarist Chris Traynor, bass player Paul Bushnell and Jamie Muhoberac on keyboards, as well as David A. Stewart of Eurythmics fame, Linda Perry, Joel Shearer, Katy Perry and Garbage singer Shirley Manson.

The song "Can't Stop the World" was originally written and recorded for the short-lived TV series Drive. The song is also known by the alternate title "Some Days," but the finalized Wanderlust artwork has it listed as "Can't Stop the World."

Critical reception

Wanderlust received generally mixed reviews from music critics. At Metacritic, which assigns a normalized rating out of 100 to reviews from mainstream critics, the album received an average score of 48, based on 7 reviews.

Mikael Wood, writing for the Los Angeles Times, found nothing groundbreaking in the album's musicianship but gave note of Rossdale's writing giving off "a whiff of universality" along with "an appealing guilelessness" saying that "Iffy lyrics aside, Wanderlust finds Rossdale circling back to the heavy pop he does best." Brian Orloff from Entertainment Weekly called the record "at its best, a bright collection of Daughtry-esque rock boasting anthems" but that it falters when delving into "saccharine sentiments."

AllMusic senior editor Stephen Thomas Erlewine said that Rossdale's charismatic vocals work well in the album's field of MOR-style rock but concluded that "this is still deliberately tepid music, more concerned about appearances than hooks or drama." Rolling Stones Jody Rosen felt that Rossdale was ill-suited on the power ballads and worked best in grunge where he delivered lyrically thought-provoking material but said that it was "a goal that exceeds his gifts as a songwriter."

Rob Sheffield from Blender panned the album's tracks for coming across more like "a mealy-mouthed, cliché-ridden, bombastic Chris Cornell solo joint", and the use of Auto-Tune on Rossdale's vocals. Michael Roffman of Consequence of Sound criticized the record for containing "double vocal tracks" and "Nickelback-like singalongs" that added to Rossdale's digital layered performance and lazy lyricism.

Track listing

Bonus tracks

2013 Edel Records re-release

Chart positions

Personnel
 Gavin Rossdale – lead vocals, guitar
 Chris Traynor – guitar
 Paul Bushnell – bass
 Jamie Muhoberac – keyboards
 Josh Freese – drums
 Gwen Stefani – backing vocals on "Can't Stop the World"
 Shirley Manson – backing vocals on "The Trouble I'm In"
 Katy Perry – backing vocals on "Another Night in the Hills"
 Toiya Barnes – backing vocals
 Esther Austin – backing vocals
 Angie Fisher – backing vocals

References 

2008 debut albums
Interscope Records albums
Gavin Rossdale albums
Albums produced by Bob Rock